The Northern Mariana Islands House of Representatives is the lower house of the Northern Mariana Islands Commonwealth Legislature.

In the 2007 election cycle, the CNMI House membership was increased from 18 to 20. Representatives serve two-year terms and are elected from seven election districts:

District 1: Saipan (6 seats)
District 2: Saipan (2 seats)
District 3: Saipan & the Northern Islands (6 seats)
District 4: Saipan (2 seats)
District 5: Saipan (2 seats)
District 6: Tinian (1 seat)
District 7: Rota & Aguiguan (1 seat)

The Speaker of the Northern Mariana Islands House of Representatives is chosen by the House from among its members.

Composition of the House of Representatives

Leadership
At the start of the 23rd Commonwealth Legislature, Villagomez was reelected as speaker while Joel Castro Camacho was elected vice-speaker and Edwin Propst was elected floor leader. On January 13, 2023, the four-member minority elected Patrick Hofschneider San Nicolas as minority leader.

Members of the 23rd Legislature
In the 2020 general election for the 22nd Legislature, the Republican Party won nine seats, a resurgent Democratic Party won eight seats, and three seats were won by independents. Two of those independents, Edmund Joseph Sablan Villagomez and Donald Manalang Manglona, are aligned with the Democratic Party while Joseph Flores is aligned with the Republican Party. On July 23, 2021, the death of Republican 3rd district representative Ivan A. Blanco created a vacancy, to be filled in an October 16 special election. Democrat Corina Magofna won the special election, flipping the seat. In the 2022 elections for the 23rd Legislature, independents made significant gains, reducing the number of Democrats and Republicans in the House. However, 12 of the 13 independents formed a coalition government with the 4 Democrats.

Past composition of the House of Representatives

See also
Northern Mariana Islands Senate
List of Northern Mariana Islands Governors

References

Notes

External links
Official website
The 16th Legislature, Saipan Tribune, 2008-01-14

Politics of the Northern Mariana Islands
Political organizations based in the Northern Mariana Islands
Territorial lower houses in the United States
Government of the Northern Mariana Islands